Findlater may refer to:

Findlater (surname)
Findlater, Saskatchewan, a village in Canada
Findlater Castle, a castle in Scotland
Earl of Findlater, a title in the Peerage of Scotland
Findlater Stewart (1879–1960), an Anglo-Indian civil servant